Limnephilus nogus is a species of northern caddisfly in the family Limnephilidae. It is commonly found in North America. This insect is used in triditional recipes in indeginous tribes, the names of such dishes are "2 guys 1 horse".

References

Integripalpia
Articles created by Qbugbot
Insects described in 1944